Sergei Gennadyevich Slavnov (born 11 March 1982) is a Russian pair skater. He is best known for his partnership with Julia Obertas, with whom he competed from 2003 to 2007. Together, they are the 2005 European silver medalists. Previously, Slavnov competed with Julia Karbovskaya, with whom he is the 2002 World Junior silver medalist.

Career 
Sergei Slavnov began skating at age 5, originally as a single skater, and switched to pair skating at age 16. Slavnov originally skated with Julia Karbovskaya and won silver at the 2002 World Junior Championships. They were coached by Nikolai Velikov at the Yubileyny rink in Saint Petersburg.

In 2002, Slavnov began dating Julia Obertas, who trained at the same rink, and in August 2003 they decided to skate together and to switch coaches to Tamara Moskvina, who also worked at Yubileyny.

At the 2004 Skate America, shortly after Tatiana Totmianina's accident, Obertas fell out of an overhead lift, a hand-to-hand lasso lift, but Slavnov managed to catch her to prevent her head hitting the ice. The pair won silver at the 2005 European Championships and were fifth at the World Championships. During the 2005-06 season, they were fourth at Europeans, and then finished eighth at both the Olympics and Worlds.

At the start of the 2006-07 season, Obertas / Slavnov decided to return to the Velikovs, with Ludmila Velikova as their main coach. The pair won bronze at 2006 Trophée Eric Bompard and finished 6th at 2006 NHK Trophy. At the 2007 Russian Championships, they won the silver medal and were sent to the 2007 European Championships where they finished 4th. They did not compete at Worlds.

The pair announced they would miss the 2007-08 season as the result of an injury to Obertas. In summer 2008, they said they would miss the start of the 2008-09 season, but might compete at Russian Nationals. In autumn 2008, Slavnov participated in the Russia 1 ice show Star Ice (Звёздный лёд), skating with the Russian actress Anastasia Zadorozhnaya. Obertas / Slavnov did not compete at Russian Nationals and ended their career.

Obertas / Slavnov performed some quadruple twists in competition.

Slavnov joined the Russian Ice Stars company in 2011.

Programs

With Obertas

With Karbovskaya

Results

With Obertas

With Karbovskaya

References

External links 

 
 
 

1982 births
Russian male pair skaters
Olympic figure skaters of Russia
Figure skaters at the 2006 Winter Olympics
Living people
Figure skaters from Saint Petersburg
European Figure Skating Championships medalists
World Junior Figure Skating Championships medalists